Michael J. Gorman (born 1955) is an American New Testament scholar. He is the Raymond E. Brown Professor of Biblical Studies and Theology at St. Mary's Seminary and University. From 1995 to 2012 he was dean of St. Mary's Ecumenical Institute.

Gorman specializes especially in the letters, theology, and spirituality of the Apostle Paul. He is associated with the "participationist perspective" on Paul's theology. His additional specialties are the book of Revelation, theological and missional interpretation of Scripture, the gospel of John, and early Christian ethics. Gorman was born and raised in Anne Arundel County, Maryland, graduating from Glen Burnie High School in Glen Burnie, Maryland. He earned his Bachelor of Arts degree summa cum laude in French from Gordon College in Wenham, Massachusetts. He received the Master of Divinity and Doctor of Philosophy cum laude in New Testament from Princeton Theological Seminary, where he was also a teaching fellow in New Testament and an instructor in New Testament Greek. He has also been a visiting professor at Duke Divinity School, Regent College, Carey Baptist College (New Zealand), Wesley Theological Seminary, and two theological schools in Africa. Gorman has led several study trips to Greece/Turkey/Rome and to France/Switzerland. A United Methodist, Gorman is an active layperson and a popular teacher at colleges, seminaries, churches, and conferences representing many traditions. In the mid-2010s, despite still being a Methodist, Gorman began teaching in a Roman Catholic context.  His older son, Rev. Dr. Mark Gorman, is a pastor and theologian who is also on the faculty of St. Mary's Ecumenical Institute.

Gorman is the author of nearly twenty books and more than sixty articles on Biblical interpretation and on ethics.

Selected works

Thesis

Books
On Paul

Other New Testament Subjects

Chapters

Articles

References

1955 births
American biblical scholars
American United Methodists
Christian scholars
Gordon College (Massachusetts) alumni
Living people
Methodist writers
New Testament scholars
Princeton Theological Seminary alumni
St. Mary's Seminary and University faculty